North Hempstead Town Hall is a historic town hall building located on Plandome Road in Manhasset in Nassau County, on Long Island, in New York, United States.

Description 
The building serves as the main administrative building for the Town of North Hempstead. The original section was built in 1906–1907.  Flanking additions were built in 1926-1928 and the large rear extension was completed in 1955. The original section is three bays wide and two and one half stories high, built of brick with cast stone accents.  A copper domed, eight sided wooden cupola was added in 1928.

In 2006, the building was added to the National Register of Historic Places.

References

External links

City and town halls on the National Register of Historic Places in New York (state)
Colonial Revival architecture in New York (state)
Government buildings completed in 1906
Buildings and structures in Nassau County, New York
National Register of Historic Places in North Hempstead (town), New York
1906 establishments in New York (state)